Amelia Spence (born 23 June 1993) is a former Australian field hockey player.

Personal life
Spence was born in Hobart, Tasmania, and made her senior international debut in a test series against New Zealand in November 2014.

Career

Junior National Team
Spence first represented Australia in its junior ranks, representing the Under 21 side, 'The Jillaroos'.

She first represented the team at the Australian Youth Olympic Festival in 2013, winning gold with the team. She was also a member of the team at the 2013 Junior World Cup, where Australia finished in sixth place.

Senior National Team
Following her debut against New Zealand, Spence represented Australia at the 2014 Champions Trophy. At the tournament, she scored her first international goal in the semi-final against New Zealand.

Spence last represented Australia in September 2015, in a test match against Korea.

International Goals

External References

References

1993 births
Living people
Australian female field hockey players
Sportswomen from Tasmania
Female field hockey midfielders
21st-century Australian women